Ilhéu dos Pássaros is a small uninhabited islet in the Cape Verde archipelago. It is a low, flat islet, covered with sedimentary material and sand. It is connected  with the main island by a chain of reefs and volcanic rocks. It is an important nesting site for white-faced storm petrel and band-rumped storm petrel.

References

Uninhabited islands of Cape Verde
Protected areas of Cape Verde
Geography of Boa Vista, Cape Verde